Rigby's La Plaza Historic District is a U.S. historic district (designated as such on April 25, 1994) located in Sarasota, Florida. The district runs from 1002 through 1038 South Osprey Avenue, 1744 and 1776 Alta Vista Street and 1777 Irving Avenue. It contains 8 historic buildings and 2 objects.

References

External links
 Sarasota County listings at National Register of Historic Places

National Register of Historic Places in Sarasota County, Florida
Historic districts on the National Register of Historic Places in Florida
Buildings and structures in Sarasota, Florida
1994 establishments in Florida